The  is a Japanese multimedia franchise featuring the cast and characters of the popular Kamen Rider Series Kamen Rider Den-O and its films.

History
Kamen Rider Den-O was the seventeenth installment of the Kamen Rider series and the eighth during the Heisei period run of the series, a joint production between Toei Company, TV Asahi, and the late Shotaro Ishinomori's production company Ishimori Productions. Its first film, Kamen Rider Den-O: I'm Born! opened in Japanese theaters on August 4, 2007. In its opening weekend, the movie came in 4th place and was the highest selling Japanese production of the week.

Later in 2007, Toei had announced that they were in production for a V-Cinema release for Den-O coupled with Kamen Rider Kiva, but this was later changed to be a direct, albeit limited, theatrical release entitled Kamen Rider Den-O & Kiva: Climax Deka. In its opening weekend, April 12, 2008, Climax Deka took the top spot at the Japanese box offices, unseating the Japanese release of Cloverfield. In the end, it grossed 730 million yen, over double the normal revenue for a Kamen Rider film.

Later in 2008, another press release from Toei announced that there was to be a third film for Den-O entitled, Saraba Kamen Rider Den-O: Final Countdown. Having a third film was the first for any of the Heisei Kamen Rider television series, a fact that Takeru Satoh, who had played the lead role of Ryotaro Nogami in the television series, attributes to Den-O's comedic timing. Eventually this was originally considered to be the last appearance of Den O. However because of its rising popularity, Toei Company  announced  on January 29, 2009,that there would be a fourth film for Den-O, and that it was in production as of January 29, 2009. The film was scheduled to be released in April 2009. On February 9, 2009, Toei revealed that this film was to be the first in the Cho-Den-O series. and that the film would feature the cast and characters of I'm Born!, Final Countdown, Kiva, and Kamen Rider Decade.

The Onigashima Warship

The first film in the Cho-Den-O series is titled  released on May 1, 2009. The film features the return of the Tarōs, Deneb, and Sieg, along with New Den-O from Final Countdown, Jiro, Ramon, and Riki of Kiva, and Tsukasa and Natsumi of Decade. The film also introduces Akina Minami portraying a bushi woman named .

Cho-Den-O Trilogy

 is the name given to a series of three films released in a four-week period between May 22 and June 19, 2010. The films, Episode Red, Blue, and Yellow, each focus on a different Kamen Rider in the extended Cho-Den-O storyline: Zeronos, New Den-O, and Diend of Decade. The trilogy was originally posted as a rumor on Futaba Channel as a single film titled , however the April issue of Televi-kun confirmed the Cho-Den-O Trilogy title.

References

External links
 
 

Kamen Rider films